Mervyn Robert Wilson (1922 – 18 November 2022) was an Anglican priest in Ireland in the 20th century who was Dean of Dromore from 1990 to 1992.

Wilson was born in 1922 in East Belfast. He was educated at Everton Elementary School and Sullivan Upper School, followed by the University of Bristol and ordination training at Tyndale Hall, Bristol. He was ordained deacon in 1952 and priest in 1953. He was successively curate of Ballymacarrett (1952–56), Donaghcloney (1956–59); and Newtownards (1959–61). He was then Rector of Ballyphilip with Ardquin (1961–70); St Philip's, Newry (1970–92); Rural Dean of Kilbroney and Newry and Mourne (1977–90); Prebendary of Dromore Cathedral (1983–85); Canon of Belfast Cathedral (1985–89); and finally Dean of Dromore (1990–92).

He died in 2022, aged 100.

References

20th-century Irish Anglican priests
1922 births
2022 deaths
Deans of Dromore